Jeannette R. Ickovics is an American health and social psychologist.  She is the inaugural Samuel and Liselotte Herman Professor of Social and Behavioral Sciences at the Yale School of Public Health and Professor of Psychology at the Graduate School of Arts and Sciences at Yale University. She was the Founding Chair of the Social and Behavioral Sciences at the Yale School of Public Health and Founding Director of Community Alliance for Research and Engagement (CARE). She served as the Dean of Faculty at Yale-NUS College in Singapore from 2018-2021.

Professor Ickovics is a dedicated teacher, mentor and scholar. She led a US National Institutes of Health transdisciplinary training grant to invest in the next generation of scientists to advance prevention research in general and with regard to HIV risk reduction specifically. Her research investigates the interplay of complex biomedical, behavioural, social and psychological factors that influence individual and community health. She has worked in the areas of maternal-child health, mental health, and multi-sector approaches to chronic disease prevention. Dedicated to social justice, equity, inclusion and diversity, she uses this lens to examine challenges faced by those often marginalised by the healthcare system and by society. She has expertise running large, scientifically rigorous clinical trials in community settings. Her community-engaged research – funded with more than US$40 million in grants from the US National Institutes of Health, Centers for Disease Control and Prevention, and foundations – is characterised by methodological rigour and cultural sensitivity. She is author of more than 200 peer-reviewed publications. Ickovics was elected as Fellow of the Academy of Behavioral Medicine Research and the American Psychological Association and is a recipient of numerous awards, including the Strickland-Daniel Mentoring Award from the American Psychological Association.

Research 
Ickovics and her colleagues developed, implemented and evaluated the first standardized curricula for group prenatal care and published the first randomized controlled trials of CenteringPregnancy, now implemented in more than 500 clinical settings [1-2]. This research has been cited as foundational for group prenatal care with special populations such as refugees, teens, military populations, pregnant women with chronic diseases including diabetes and HIV, and high-risk pregnant women – especially Black women with a focus on reducing racial and health disparities [3-4].  Group prenatal care is associated with a lower prevalence of preterm birth, low birthweight, small for gestational age, and neonatal intensive care (NICU) utilization [e.g., 5-10]. Group prenatal care also has been associated with improved maternal mental health, breastfeeding, optimal pregnancy weight gain and improved postpartum weight loss, better birth spacing, lower sexual risk, and higher patient satisfaction [e.g., 10-16].

In addition, Ickovics and her colleagues have made substantial contributions to public health’s understanding of the influence of the social and environmental factors that contribute to poor health outcomes. CARE (Community Alliance for Research and Engagement) works directly with neighbourhood residents and leaders to form local partnerships, empower residents, identify challenges, and provide resources to promote wellness through action [17-18]. They have conducted collaborative interventions to improve community/population health. For example, in partnership with the New Haven Public Schools and the Rudd Center for Food Policy and Obesity, they conducted a randomized controlled trial documenting how school-based policies could reduce risk and improve outcomes related to obesity, chronic disease and academic achievement [19-20].

References 

1.      Ickovics JR, Lewis JB, Cunningham SD, et al. Transforming prenatal care: Multidisciplinary team science improves a broad range of maternal-child outcomes. American Psychologist. 2019; 19:120. . PMID 31023259

2.      Rising SS, Quimby C. The CenteringPregnancy model: The power of group healthcare. New York: Springer; 2017.

3.       Carter EB, Temming LA, Akin J, et al. Group prenatal care compared with traditional prenatal care: A systematic review and meta-analysis. Obstetrics & Gynecology. 2016;128(3):551-561.

4.       Byerley BM, Haas DM. A systematic overview of the literature regarding group prenatal care for high-risk pregnant women. BMC Pregnancy and Childbirth. 2017;17(1):329.

5.       Cunningham SD, Lewis JB, Shebl FM, et al. Group prenatal care reduces risk of preterm birth and low birth weight: A matched cohort study. Journal of Women's Health. 2019;28(1):17-22.

6.       Ickovics JR, Kershaw TS, Westdahl C, et al. Group prenatal care and perinatal outcomes: A randomized controlled trial. Obstetrics & Gynecology. 2007;110(2 Pt 1):330-339.

7.       Gareau S, Lòpez-De Fede A, Loudermilk BL, et al. Group prenatal care results in Medicaid savings with better outcomes: A propensity score analysis of CenteringPregnancy participation in South Carolina. Maternal & Child Health Journal. 2016;20(7):1384-1393.

8.       Crockett AH, Heberlein EC, Smith JC, Ozluk P, Covington-Kolb S, Willis C. Effects of a multi-site expansion of group prenatal care on birth outcomes. Maternal and Child Health Journal. 2019;23(10):1424-1433.

9.       Ickovics JR, Earnshaw V, Lewis JB, et al. Cluster randomized controlled trial of group prenatal care: Perinatal outcomes among adolescents in New York City health centers. American Journal of Public Health. 2016;106(2):359-365.

10.   Felder JN, Epel E, Lewis JB, et al. Depressive symptoms and gestational length among pregnant adolescents: Cluster randomized control trial of CenteringPregnancy® Plus group prenatal care. Journal of Consulting and Clinical Psychology. 2017;85(6):574-584.

11.   Ickovics JR, Reed E, Magriples U et al. Effects of group prenatal care on psychosocial risk in pregnancy: Results from a randomised controlled trial. Psychology & Health. 2011;26(2):235-250.

12.   Tubay AT, Mansalis KA, Simpson MJ, et al. The effects of group prenatal care on infant birthweight and maternal well-being: A randomized controlled trial. Military Medicine. 2019;184(5-6):e440-e446.

13.   Trotman G, Chhatre G, Darolia R, Tefera E, Damle L, Gomez-Lobo V. The effect of Centering Pregnancy versus traditional prenatal care models on improved adolescent health behaviors in the perinatal period. Journal of Pediatrics & Adolescent Gynecology. 2015;28(5):395-401.

14.   Magriples U, Boynton MH, Kershaw TS, et al. The impact of group prenatal care on pregnancy and postpartum weight trajectories. American Journal of Obstetrics & Gynecology. 2015;213(5):688. e681-688. e689.

15.   Kershaw TS, Magriples U, Westdahl C, Rising SS, Ickovics J. Pregnancy as a window of opportunity for HIV prevention: Effects of an HIV intervention delivered within prenatal care. American Journal of Public Health. 2009;99(11):2079-2086.

16.   DeCesare JZ, Hannah D, Amin R. Postpartum contraception use rates of patients participating in the Centering Pregnancy model of care versus traditional obstetrical care. Journal of Reproductive Medicine. 2017;62(1-2):45-49.

17.   Bromage W, Santilli A & Ickovics JR. Organizing Communities to Benefit Public Health. American Journal of Public Health. 2015;105:1965-1966. PMCID:PMC45665665.

18.   Carroll-Scott A, Rosenthal L, Gilstad-Hayden K, Ickovics JR. Disentangling Neighborhood Contextual Associations with Child Body Mass Index, Diet and Physical Activity: The Role of Built, Socioeconomic, and Social Environments. Social Science & Medicine. 2013;95:106-114. PMCID:PMC4058500

19.   Ickovics JR, Duffany KO, Shebl F, Read M, Peters S, Schwartz M. Implementing school-based policies to prevent obesity: Cluster randomized trial. American Journal of Preventive Medicine. 2019;56:e1-e11.

20.   Ickovics JR, Carroll-Scott A, Gilstad-Hayden K, Schwartz M, Peters S, McCaslin C. Health and Academic Achievement: Cumulative Effects of Health Assets on Standardized Test Scores among Urban Youth in the United States. Journal of School Health. 2014;84:40-48. PMCID:PMC4058503

External links 
Link to faculty page
Link to research lab website
Link to published works

American women epidemiologists
American epidemiologists
American women psychologists
Muhlenberg College alumni
George Washington University alumni
Yale University faculty
Year of birth missing (living people)
Living people